Jennings House, located in Annapolis, Maryland, was the residence of the governors of Maryland from 1777 until 1870, when it was replaced by Government House. The building was sold to the United States Naval Academy in 1869 for $25,000. It was demolished in 1901.

Governor George Howard, son of  Governor John Eager Howard, was born in Jennings House in 1789.

References

External links
Photo of Jennings House

Governors' mansions in the United States
History of Maryland
Houses in Annapolis, Maryland
Government buildings in Maryland
Demolished buildings and structures in Maryland
Buildings and structures demolished in 1901